Nana Kashim Shettima (born 22 July 1975) is the wife of the vice president-elect of Nigeria, Kashim Shettima. She was the first lady of Borno State from 2011 to 2019. She is the CEO of SWOT foundation and Model Orphanage Integrated School, Maiduguri.

Background 
Nana Usman Alkali was born in 1975 in Kano State to the family of Alhaji Usman Alkali who hails from Borno State and a Kanuri by tribe. She married Kashim Shettima in 1988 and has three children. She is an alumnus of the University of Maiduguri where she studied English Language and Literature.

Shettima, with the private support of her husband, she carried out numerous humanitarian and social activities in support of orphans and widows. This led to her setting up the Model Orphanage Integrated School in Maiduguri in 2018 to cater for orphans, widows and bereaved in Borno State.

During the insecurity that affected Borno State especially at the time of the Chibok school girls abduction in 2014, against security reports Shettima travelled to Chibok by road to console with the parents of the school girls and offer moral support. That action made her to miss a meeting with the first lady Dame Patience Jonathan in Abuja.

She earned an award from The Sun Newspaper as the most supportive First Lady in 2016.

Through her pet project 2012 Support for Widows, Orphans and Tsangaya Foundation SWOT, as the First Lady of Borno State, Shettima has been reaching out to adherents of all faiths during festivities in Borno State especially the most vulnerable.

Shettima is an advocate for the fight against rape and drug abuse imploring women to prioritize  children's upbringing.
She was also at the for front canvassing votes for her spouse in the 2023 election.

References 

Living people
1975 births
Nigerian Muslims
People from Borno State
University of Maiduguri alumni
Nigerian women in politics
Wives of national leaders